The 1928 Drake Bulldogs football team was an American football represented Drake University in the Missouri Valley Conference (MVC) during the 1928 college football season. In its eighth season under head coach Ossie Solem, the team compiled a 7–1 record (3–0 against MVC opponents), won the MVC championship, and outscored all opponents by a total of 141 to 52. The team's only loss was against Knute Rockne's Notre Dame Fighting Irish.

Key players included halfback Dick Nesbitt and guard Lester Jones.

Schedule

References

Drake
Drake Bulldogs football seasons
Missouri Valley Conference football champion seasons
Drake Bulldogs football